Rosedale Transit Center is a transit center in the Saint Paul suburb of Roseville, Minnesota. The transit center is named after the adjacent shopping mall, Rosedale Center. Rosedale Transit Center is the northern terminus for the Metro A Line, a bus rapid transit line serving Saint Paul and south Minneapolis. The site is leased to Metro Transit by the mall, and includes an indoor waiting area, real-time information, and ticket vending machines. The transit center also provides timed transfers to eight local bus routes.

See also 
Metro
A Line

References

External links 
 Metro Transit: Rosedale Transit Center

Bus stations in Minnesota
Bus rapid transit in Minnesota